"Good Old Days" is a song by American rapper Macklemore, featuring American singer-songwriter Kesha. It was written by Macklemore, Kesha, Budo, Andrew Joslyn, Sam Wishkoski and Tyler Andrews, with lyrics written by Macklemore and Kesha and production handled by Budo. Originally released  as a promotional single on September 19, 2017, the song was sent to adult contemporary radio in the United States on October 9, 2017, as the third single from Macklemore's second solo studio album, Gemini (2017). As of October 9, 2017, "Good Old Days" has sold 48,000 digital copies in the United States according to Nielsen SoundScan.

Background
On January 18, 2017, Macklemore posted a photo of him and Kesha together on Instagram, hinting at an upcoming collaboration. The song first appeared in the track list of Gemini, which was unveiled on August 22, 2017. Macklemore spoke to Rolling Stone about collaborating with Kesha, saying: "Kesha, she is a great spirit. She is someone that I walked into the room and I immediately just caught a vibe with and became friends with pretty instantaneously... She's a musician, she's a writer, she's someone that is not afraid to try ideas in the studio, not afraid to get vulnerable in front of people, not scared to go for the high note when she doesn't know if she can hit it or not. She is a musician in every sense of the word, and she's hilarious." He also revealed that Ryan Lewis facilitated the collaboration. When asked about how he reached out to Kesha, he said: "Well, Ryan had a session with her in Seattle. She was already here. They had already done 'Praying' and they were working on a couple other records that I don't think made her album. She had [an] off day and I hit Ryan and was like, 'Would you mind if I hit up Kesha?' And he was like, 'Of course not.'" Kesha said of the song on Twitter: "My new song with Macklemore reminds me of being 16 chasing wild dreams not knowing those moments would be so precious."

Critical reception
Caitlin Kelley of Billboard deemed "Good Old Days" a "mellow yet catchy pop song". Mark Braboy of Vibe praised Macklemore for showcasing "his best, introspectively rapping", and Kesha providing "some soul-stirring vocals to make the song hit home". Madeline Roth of MTV News wrote that "the nostalgic track is a stripped-back affair". Alex Ungerman‍ of Entertainment Tonight felt Kesha's voice "soars over a piano ballad that is somehow both somber and uplifting in tone". Peter Berry of XXL thinks that the song is "fueled by piano, sentimentality and the sweet vocals of Kesha". Jon Powell of Respect regarded the song as "a pop ballad-esque cut" and "the perfect record for personal reflection and self-love". Derrick Rossignol of Uproxx called the song a "piano-led pop ballad", and felt Kesha's vocal is beautiful and powerful. Anya Crittenton of Gay Star News described the song as "an emotional tune" that "features a simple piano and drum-filled melody". Aron A. of HotNewHipHop wrote: "Kesha handles the hook with her powerful vocals over a soft and simple piano progression". Lindsay Howard of Variance described the song as an "explicitly nostalgic cut".

Live performances
On September 25, 2017, Macklemore performed "Good Old Days" with Kesha on The Ellen DeGeneres Show. They gave their second televised performance of the song at the 2018 Billboard Music Awards on May 20, 2018.

Credits and personnel
Credits adapted from YouTube.

 Macklemore – songwriting
 Kesha – songwriting
 Budo – composing, production
 Andrew Joslyn – production, string arrangement, violin
 Sam Wishkoski – composing, additional piano
 Tyler Andrews – composing
 Christopher Foerstel – violin
 Seth May-Patterson – viola
 Eli Weinberger – cello
 Teo Shantz – additional percussion
 Tanisha Brooks – choir vocals
 Josephine Howell – choir vocals
 Karma Johnson – choir vocals
 Jon Castelli – mixing
 Dale Becker – mastering
 Tyler Dopps – engineering
 Mandy Adams – mastering assistant
 Ingmar Carlson – mixing engineering

Charts

Weekly charts

Year-end charts

Certifications

Release history

Notes

References

2010s ballads
2017 singles
2017 songs
Kesha songs
Macklemore songs
Songs about nostalgia
Pop ballads
Elektra Records singles
Songs written by Kesha
Songs written by Macklemore